Highland Chinantec is a Chinantecan language of Mexico, spoken in Comaltepec, San Juan Quiotepec, and surrounding towns in northern Oaxaca. It has a complex system of tone and vowel length compared to other Chinantec languages. The two principal varieties, Quiotepec and Comaltepec, have marginal mutual intelligibility. Yolox Chinantec is somewhat less divergent.

Phonology

Comaltepec 
The following are sounds of Comaltepec Chinantec:

1. Parenthesised sounds are loans, allophones, or free variants
2. Voiced stops are frequently prenasalised

Tones

Quiotepec 
The following are sounds of Quiotepec Chinantec:

1. // is heard as a glide [] after //.

Tones

References

Chinantec languages